Johnny Kelly (born March 9, 1968) is an American musician, best known as the former drummer of gothic metal band Type O Negative. He is the current drummer for the bands Silvertomb, A Pale Horse Named Death, Kill Devil Hill, Danzig, and Quiet Riot.

Career 
Kelly joined Type O Negative in 1994 to replace Sal Abruscato. He had previously been the band's drum tech.

Kelly served as a fill-in drummer for heavy metal band Pist.On on an American tour while their drummer, Jeff McManus, dealt with chronic muscle pain.

On February 25, 2011, it was announced that Kelly would be replacing Will Hunt as the drummer for Black Label Society for the remainder of their European tour. He made his first live performance with the band that night at La Cigale in Paris, France. 

On March 10, 2014, it was announced that Vinny Appice had left Kill Devil Hill, and that Kelly was his replacement.

On January 29, 2018, it was announced on the band's website that A Pale Horse Named Death had recruited Tommy Spano of Corey Glover and Sekond Skyn as the new drummer, replacing Kelly. On April 5, 2018, it was announced that Kelly was once again the band's drummer.

Kelly has been the drummer for Danzig since 2002 (with the exception of a hiatus from 2003 to 2005), and recorded drums for the band's ninth album Deth Red Sabaoth (2010), covers album Skeletons (2015), and shared drum duty on the band's latest album Black Laden Crown (2017).

On September 9, 2020, it was announced that Kelly had joined Quiet Riot as the replacement of then-recently deceased drummer Frankie Banali. Kelly had previously filled in for Banali on the band's 2019 and 2020 shows.

References

External links
Official Type O Negative website
Official Seventh Void website
Official A Pale Horse Named Death website
Interview from 2006 at GlobalDomination.se

1968 births
Living people
American heavy metal drummers
Musicians from Brooklyn
Musicians from New York (state)
Danzig (band) members
Type O Negative members
American rock drummers
Seven Witches members
20th-century American drummers
American male drummers
Black Label Society members
Kill Devil Hill (band) members
Quiet Riot members